Fort Mott may refer to:

Fort Mott (New Jersey)
Fort Mott (Vermont)

See also
Fort Motte